Puthiyakavu is located in Kilimanoor (Kilimanoor) city, in Kerala in southern India. The puthiyakavu devi temple, choottayil juma masjid kilimanoor GHSS, RRV GIRLS HSS, RRV BOYS VHSS, kilimanoor market, BSNL office and the head post office are located here.

References

Villages in Thiruvananthapuram district